The Batskelevich Cavalry Group was a cavalry formation of the Red Army during World War II.

Formed on 18 July 1941 in the Western Front under the command of the 32nd Cavalry Division's commander.

This was the first of the Cavalry Groups formed during the war.  The group operated as a raiding force on the flank and rear of the German 2nd Army and 2nd Panzer Corps.  The group made several raids prior to the front stabilizing in August.  The group was disbanded in September 1942.

Composition 
 32nd Cavalry Division
 43rd Cavalry Division
 47th Cavalry Division

See also
 Cavalry corps (Red Army)

References 

Cavalry corps of the Soviet Union